The 2022–23 Cupa României is the 85th season of the annual Romanian primary football knockout tournament. The winner will be qualify for the second qualifying round of the 2023–24 UEFA Europa Conference League. It is the first season in which the Round of 16 was replaced by a play-off, immediately followed by a group stage, in which the best 8 teams from Liga 1 will also enter directly. In this round, the 24 teams remaining in the competition will be divided into 4 groups of 6, two each from value boxes 1, 2 and 3. The Romanian Cup will end with the "quarters", semi-finals and final stages, all contested in one leg.

Group stage
The draw was held on 30 September 2022.

Group A

Group B

Group C

Group D

Quarter-finals
The matches will be played on 5 April 2023.

|-
|colspan="3" style="background-color:#97DEFF"|5 April 2023

|}

References

 
Romania
Cupa României seasons
Romania